The Constitution Alteration (Trade and Commerce) Bill 1912,  was an unsuccessful referendum held in 1913 that sought to alter the Australian Constitution to extend Commonwealth legislative power in respect to trade and commerce.

Issues
The "Yes" Case
The trade and commerce power is the keystone of the powers of the federal parliament. The present limitation to inter-state trade and commerce paralyses the parliament's action in almost every direction.
The present division of the trade and commerce power between federation and states is artificial, indefinite, illogical and mischievous.
Trade and commerce are national matters and state laws are not adequate.

The "No" Case
If passed, this proposal will vest in the federal government the control of all business within the Commonwealth. This will mean that the centralised government will dominate all trade and commerce, including that which is carried on within state borders.
The proposal will lead to a great deal of legal uncertainty and will no doubt be challenged in the High Court.
The new power will enable the federal parliament to pass legislation which will profoundly disturb trade and commerce within the states.

Question
Do you approve of the proposed law for the alteration of the Constitution entitled 'Constitution Alteration (Trade and Commerce) 1912'?

The proposal was to alter the text of section 51 of the Constitution to read as follows:
51. The Parliament shall, subject to this Constitution, have Legislative power to make laws for the peace, order, and good government of the Commonwealth with respect to:
(i.) Trade and commerce with other countries, and among the States but not including trade and commerce upon railways the property of a State, except so far as it is trade and commerce with other countries or among the States:

Results
The referendum was not approved by a majority of voters, and a majority of the voters was achieved in only three states.

Discussion
The 1911 referendum asked a single question that dealt with trade and commerce, corporations and industrial matters.  This resolution separated each of those matters into a different question. Like its forebear, none of these resolutions were carried. On each of the many occasions a similar question was asked at a referendum the public decided not to vest power in the Commonwealth over these matters. However, although many at the time felt strongly about the need for the Commonwealth to have limited control over commerce between the states, the High Court eventually gave much of the power to Commonwealth indirectly through later decisions, thus effectively removing the need for the Constitution to be changed anyway.

1911 referendum on trade and commerce

See also
Politics of Australia
History of Australia

References

Further reading
 Standing Committee on Legislative and Constitutional Affairs (1997) Constitutional Change: Select sources on Constitutional change in Australia 1901–1997. Australian Government Printing Service, Canberra.
 Bennett, Scott (2003). Research Paper no. 11 2002–03: The Politics of Constitutional Amendment Australian Department of the Parliamentary Library, Canberra.
 Australian Electoral Commission (2007) Referendum Dates and Results 1906 – Present AEC, Canberra.

Referendum (Trade and Commerce)
1913 referendums
1913